Philippe Grandjean (in modern French spelled Grandjon) (1666–1714) was a French type engraver notable for his series of Roman and italic types known as Romain du Roi (French: King's Roman), produced in tandem with Louis Simonneau.

Information
King Louis XIV, in 1692, directed that a typeface be designed at any necessary expense for the exclusive use of the Royal printer. The design was carried out by Grandjean and Simonneau with approval and supervision by a group of mathematicians and philosophers.

References

French typographers and type designers
1666 births
1714 deaths